William McCallin (August 8, 1842 – September 4, 1904) was Mayor of Pittsburgh, Pennsylvania, from 1887 to 1890.

Early life
Mayor McCallin was born in Mercer County, Pennsylvania north of Pittsburgh in 1842 into a livery family.

Pittsburgh politics
He was successful in elections to County Coroner and Allegheny County Sheriff in 1881. After his service as Sheriff he ran successfully for Pittsburgh mayor.  During his term in office he led the charge for prolific construction of critical infrastructure that the rapidly developing city required to be successful.  He oversaw the opening of Schenley Park in 1889.  Pittsburgh's industrial might was displayed for the world during McCallin's reign as mayor when the first mold of aluminum was cast in the city.

McCallin died in 1904 of Dropsy; and was buried in Homewood Cemetery.

References

1842 births
1904 deaths
Mayors of Pittsburgh
People from Mercer County, Pennsylvania
Deaths from edema
Burials at Homewood Cemetery